Erynnis popoviana is a small species of skipper butterfly in the family Hesperiidae. It is found in the eastern Palearctic (Mongolia, North China, East China, Central China, Ussuri).

Description from Seitz

popoviana Nordm. (= sinina Gr.-Grsh.) (86 c) is hardly more than a synonym [of tages]; light grey, with a row of white marginal dots and a second similar row in the centre, the hindwing with a light discocellular spot.

See also
List of butterflies of Russia

References

Erynnis
Butterflies described in 1851